Brandhärd is a hip hop group from Basel-Country in Switzerland. It is best known in the German-speaking parts of Switzerland.

The three friends Johny Holiday, Fetch and Fierce founded Brandhärd in 1997. Two years later they already performed in front of remarkably big audiences. In 2000 their first demo tape Hip-Hop für d'Aiightgnossäschaft was released.

2005, Brandhärd released the album Zeiche setze, which peaked at position 13 in the Swiss Music Charts. Two years later, Brandhärd released an album with rapper Mamoney from Cameroun. This album is called Même Sang, which means "Same Blood" in English.

Discography 
 2000 – Hip-Hop für d'Aiightgnossäschaft
 2001 – Brandalarm
 2001 – Flächebrand
 2003 – Noochbrand
 2005 – Zeiche setze
 2007 – Même Sang (with Mamoney)
 2007 – Brandrenalin
 2010 – Blackbox
 2015 – Zuckerbrot & Peitsche
 2018 – 1997

External links
  Official Website

Swiss hip hop groups